The 2010–11 Biathlon World Cup - World Cup 7 was held in Presque Isle, Maine, United States, from 4 February until 6 February 2011.

Schedule of events 
The time schedule of the event stands below

Medal winners

Men

Women

Mixed

Achievements

 Best performance for all time

 , 6th place in Sprint
 , 20th place in Sprint and 18th place in Pursuit
 , 26th place in Sprint
 , 35th place in Sprint
 , 36th place in Sprint
 , 43rd place in Sprint
 , 51st place in Sprint and 44 place in Pursuit
 , 56th place in Sprint and 51st place in Pursuit
 , 58th place in Sprint and 52nd place in Pursuit
 , 65th place in Sprint
 , 67th place in Sprint
 , 70th place in Sprint
 , 1st place in Pursuit
 , 10th place in Pursuit
 , 3rd place in Sprint
 , 6th place in Sprint
 , 8th place in Sprint and 7th in Pursuit
 , 14th place in Sprint
 , 16th place in Sprint and Pursuit
 , 31st place in Sprint
 , 34th place in Sprint and 31st at Pursuit
 , 46th place in Sprint
 , 53rd place in Sprint and 52nd in Pursuit
 , 2nd place in Pursuit
 , 14th place in Pursuit
 , 17th place in Pursuit
 , 50th place in Pursuit

 First World Cup race

 , 17th place in Sprint
 , 66th place in Sprint
 , 39th place in Sprint
 , 54th place in Sprint

References 

2010–11 Biathlon World Cup
Biathlon World Cup - World Cup 7
February 2011 sports events in the United States
Biathlon competitions in the United States
Presque Isle, Maine
Sports competitions in Maine
2011 in sports in Maine